Oqaab (meaning "eagle") is the national digital terrestrial television (DTT) service in Afghanistan, operated by the privately owned Afghanistan Broadcasting System (ABS). The service rolled out in April 2015 starting in Kabul and has been expanding to other cities and regions in the country, as ABS has been investing in providing the necessary infrastructure. It broadcasts currently 65 local and international TV channels (all Free To Air) in the DVB-T2 standard. In the upcoming future the international FTA channels will be replaced by a Pay TV offer.

References

External links
www.oqaab.af

Digital television
Mass media in Afghanistan